Herman Hollerith (February 29, 1860 – November 17, 1929) was a German-American statistician, inventor, and businessman who developed an electromechanical tabulating machine for punched cards to assist in summarizing information and, later, in accounting. His invention of the punched card tabulating machine, patented in 1884, marks the beginning of the era of mechanized binary code and semiautomatic data processing systems, and his concept dominated that landscape for nearly a century.

Hollerith founded a company that was amalgamated in 1911 with several other companies to form the Computing-Tabulating-Recording Company. In 1924, the company was renamed "International Business Machines" (IBM) and became one of the largest and most successful companies of the 20th century. Hollerith is regarded as one of the seminal figures in the development of data processing.

Biography
Herman Hollerith was the son of German immigrant Georg Hollerith, a school teacher from Großfischlingen, Rhineland-Palatinate. He was born in Buffalo, New York, in 1860, where he also spent his early childhood. He entered the City College of New York in 1875, graduated from the Columbia School of Mines with an Engineer of Mines degree in 1879 at age 19, and, in 1890, earned a Doctor of Philosophy based on his development of the tabulating system. In 1882, Hollerith joined the Massachusetts Institute of Technology where he taught mechanical engineering and conducted his first experiments with punched cards. He eventually moved to Washington, D.C., living in Georgetown with a home on 29th Street and a business building at 31st Street and the C&O Canal, where today there is a commemorative plaque installed by IBM. He died in Washington, D.C., at age 69 of a heart attack.

Electromechanical tabulation of data

At the suggestion of John Shaw Billings, Hollerith developed a mechanism using electrical connections to increment a counter, recording information. A key idea was that a datum could be recorded by the presence or absence of a hole at a specific location on a card. For example, if a specific hole location indicates marital status, then a hole there can indicate married while not having a hole indicates single.  Hollerith determined that data in specified locations on a card, arranged in rows and columns, could be counted or sorted electromechanically. A description of this system, An Electric Tabulating System (1889), was submitted by Hollerith to Columbia University as his doctoral thesis, and is reprinted in Randell's book. On January 8, 1889, Hollerith was issued U.S. Patent 395,782, claim 2 of which reads:

The herein-described method of compiling statistics, which consists in recording separate statistical items pertaining to the individual by holes or combinations of holes punched in sheets of electrically non-conducting material, and bearing a specific relation to each other and to a standard, and then counting or tallying such statistical items separately or in combination by means of mechanical counters operated by electro-magnets the circuits through which are controlled by the perforated sheets, substantially as and for the purpose set forth.

Inventions and businesses

Hollerith had left teaching and began working for the United States Census Bureau in the year he filed his first patent application. Titled "Art of Compiling Statistics", it was filed on September 23, 1884; U.S. Patent 395,782 was granted on January 8, 1889.

Hollerith initially did business under his own name, as The Hollerith Electric Tabulating System, specializing in punched card data processing equipment. He provided tabulators and other machines under contract for the Census Office, which used them for the 1890 census. The net effect of the many changes from the 1880 census: the larger population, the data items to be collected, the Census Bureau headcount, the scheduled publications, and the use of Hollerith's electromechanical tabulators, reduced the time required to process the census from eight years for the 1880 census to six years for the 1890 census.

In 1896, Hollerith founded the Tabulating Machine Company (in 1905 renamed The Tabulating Machine Company). Many major census bureaus around the world leased his equipment and purchased his cards, as did major insurance companies. Hollerith's machines were used for censuses in England & Wales, Italy, Germany, Russia, Austria, Canada, France, Norway, Puerto Rico, Cuba, and the Philippines, and again in the 1900 census.

He invented the first automatic card-feed mechanism and the first keypunch.  The 1890 Tabulator was hardwired to operate on 1890 Census cards. A control panel in his 1906 Type I Tabulator simplified rewiring for different jobs.  The 1920s removable control panel supported prewiring and near instant job changing. These inventions were among the foundations of the data processing industry and Hollerith's punched cards (later used for computer input/output) continued in use for almost a century.

In 1911, four corporations, including Hollerith's firm, were amalgamated to form a fifth company, the Computing-Tabulating-Recording Company (CTR). Under the presidency of Thomas J. Watson, CTR was renamed International Business Machines Corporation (IBM) in 1924. By 1933 The Tabulating Machine Company name had disappeared as subsidiary companies were subsumed by IBM.

Death and legacy
Herman Hollerith died November 17, 1929. Hollerith is buried at Oak Hill Cemetery in the Georgetown neighborhood of Washington, D.C.

Hollerith cards were named after Herman Hollerith,

as were Hollerith strings and Hollerith constants.

His great-grandson, the Rt. Rev. Herman Hollerith IV, was the Episcopal bishop of the Diocese of Southern Virginia, and another great-grandson, Randolph Marshall Hollerith, is an Episcopal priest and the dean of Washington National Cathedral in Washington, D.C.

See also
 Unit record equipment
 History of IBM

Notes

References

 Includes extensive, detailed, description of Hollerith's first machines and their use for the 1890 census.

Further reading

 Beniger, James R. (1986/2009) The Control Revolution: Technological and Economic Origins of the Information Society,  Harvard University Press, 1986 pp. 390–425

 Reprinted by Arno Press, 1976, from the best available copy. Some text is illegible.
 Heide, Lars. "Herman Hollerith". In Jeffrey Fear (ed.). Immigrant Entrepreneurship: German-American Business Biographies, 1720 to the Present. German Historical Institute, 2017.

 From the Columbia Univ. History site: This article is the basis for his 1890 Columbia Ph.D. Extracts reprinted in (Randell, 1982).

 From Randell (1982),"... brief... fascinating article... describes the way in which tabulators and sorters were used on ... 100 million cards ... 1890 census."

External links

 Herman Hollerith (2017) In Immigrant Entrepreneurship Heide, Lars.  German-American Business Biographies, 1720 to the Present, vol. 4, edited by Jeffrey Fear. German Historical Institute. Last modified April 5, 2017.  Recommended!!
 Hollerith's patents from 1889:   
 Columbia University Computing History: Herman Hollerith Hollerith's 1890 Census Tabulator
 IBM Archives: Herman Hollerith The Tabulating Machine Co. plant
 Early Office Museum: Punched Card Tabulating Machines
 
 The Norwegian Historical Data Center: Census 1900  Includes a description of the use of Hollerith machines ("complicated, American enumeration machines"), together with illustrations.
 The Research notes on Herman Hollerith  collection at Hagley Museum and Library includes the research materials Geoffrey Austrian used to write Herman Hollerith: Forgotten Giant of Information Processing.
 Richard Hollerith Papers  at Hagley Museum and Library. Richard Hollerith was the grandson of Herman Hollerith and part of this collection documents the sale and settlement of the Herman Hollerith estate following the death of his last remaining child, Virginia.
  – Hollerith's house

1860 births
1929 deaths
19th-century American businesspeople
19th-century American inventors
20th-century American businesspeople
20th-century American inventors
American people of German descent
American statisticians
Burials at Oak Hill Cemetery (Washington, D.C.)
Businesspeople from Buffalo, New York
Businesspeople from Washington, D.C.
City College of New York alumni
Columbia School of Mines alumni
IBM
People from Georgetown (Washington, D.C.)
Punched card